Canterbury College is a part of the EKC Group of colleges and provides Higher Education in Canterbury, Kent, England. It was established in 1947.

The college has about 3800 students and 500 staff. It predominantly provides courses to students 16 and above. It also offers education to students between ages 14 and 16 through its Junior College, T Levels, and A Levels courses. Adult learners can also participate in part-time courses and short courses.

The College is situated near the centre of Canterbury on New Dover Road.

Redevelopment
Canterbury College completed Phase 1 and 2 (£50 million) of their campus redevelopment programme in 2008. April 2006 saw the completion of Phase 1, which included a new Children's Centre, Technology Centre, Land Based Centre, Motor Vehicle Centre and the Post-16 Centre.

Canterbury College's £19m A Block building includes facilities for students in Hair and Beauty, Sports Therapy, Veterinary Nursing, Public Services, Health and Social Care, Early Years, Supported Learning and Technology.

The £50 Million redevelopment project at Canterbury College won the LABC South East Building Excellence Awards event held in Brighton in June 2009.

The new A Block was opened in January 2012, having started with the demolition of the two teaching blocks - Becket/Cramner, which were built in the 1960s. The demolition started in March 2010 with building work commencing shortly after.

With the demolition of the sports hall beginning January 2014, the smoking area which had been a common sight on the adjacent major road was relocated to the back of the college.

The new sports, business and arts block were completed in 2016.

Spring Lane at Canterbury College 
Following a turbulent period for its previous managing group, Hadlow Group, the 2ha college campus on Spring Lane was acquired by EKC Group. Due to its close proximity to the Canterbury College site, the Spring Lane provision was integrated with that of the college.

The newly acquired facilities are used by the land-based department, offering a range of courses including Animal Management, Landscaping and Horticulture. To facilitate these subjects, the site is home to polytunnels that include a variety of plants, alongside enclosures for animals which are cared for by students.

In April 2022, EKC Group revealed plans for a major overhaul of the site. The redevelopment aims are to update the educational facilities, and to reduce the carbon footprint of the Spring Lane at Canterbury College campus.

The site is also home to Canterbury College's Junior College provision, which launched in the 2022/23 academic year. Aimed at 14- to 16-year-olds who intend to go into a land based career, the provision offers GCSEs in Maths, English, and Biology, as well as Level 2 qualifications in Countryside Studies and Personal Growth and Wellbeing.

EKC Sixth Form College
Launching in the 2022/23 academic year, EKC Group used part of the Canterbury College site to create its first A Level provision. EKC Sixth Form College comprises 25 A Level subjects, with the Extended Project qualification.

The first director of the provision is Emma Wilkinson.

Famous graduates
 Isabelle M.L. Smith, a revolutionary figure in LGBT rights and philosophy, and a key member of LGBT+ labour graduated from Canterbury College in 2016, and once stated that much of her modern philosophy as both a member of the Labour Party and a supporter of LGBT rights in the United Kingdom were developed during her time at the college.

References

External links
 www.canterburycollege.ac.uk Official website

Education in Canterbury
Higher education colleges in England
Further education colleges in Kent
Educational institutions established in 1947
1947 establishments in England